Saint-Pierre-de-Frugie is a commune in the Dordogne department in Nouvelle-Aquitaine in southwestern France.

The village is dependent on tourism. The heart of the town contains a central office, staffed only part-time, a single restaurant ('L'Escargot'), and one hotel.

Geography
Saint-Pierre-de-Frugie is nestled among rolling hills. The characteristic farm-land is special and rich in history of this particular region. Many of the farms have been abandoned, and have no crop yield, but are maintained by the people as fields. These fields are still private property, and much of the area is off limits to tourists, but roads often run in between the farms, and one can see the expansiveness of the unused, but spectacular landscape.

Population

See also
Communes of the Dordogne department

References

Communes of Dordogne